Mykolaiv International Airport, also known as Nikolaev Airport  is an airport in Mykolaiv (Nikolaev in Russian), in the Mykolaiv Oblast of Ukraine. The airport is also increased to receive the Airbus 310.

History 
In 1960, Mykolaiv Airport was made into a passenger airport. With of the flow of passengers, in 1975, the boarding terminal was built.
 
In order to have the possibility of receiving and serving airplanes like the Тu (Tupolev)-154, Il(Ilushin)-76, Аn(Antonov)-22, and Il-62, in 1989, the boarding gate at the airport was upgraded.

In 1992, Mykolaiv Airport passed its international certification, through which it was able to accept and handle aircraft from other countries. In 1993, a new passenger terminal was built. In that year the airport received its certificate for the third category of International organization of passenger aviation (IKAO) as an airport for internal flights in the USSR with the right to accept Ty-134 airplanes and airplanes of similar classes.

In April 2007, Mykolaiv Oblast (regional) Council decided to joint-stockicize the airport, with the goal of subsequent privatization. In March 2008, the Oblast Council created a commission for privatization of the enterprise, Mykolaiv International Airport.
 
In January 2009, the Mykolaiv Oblast State Administration reorganized the cooperative enterprise Mykolaiv International Airport into an open stock society. In October 2010, the Mykolaiv Oblast Council canceled its decision to privatize the cooperative enterprise, Mykolaiv International Airport and to reorganize the airport into a public stock society. As was communicated in the session of the County Council, of Mykolaiv County State Administration Igor Katvaluk said: "Until today, not one serious buyer or interested party came to us to invest in our airport. The furthest finding of the airport in procedure of privatization is held its development as a cooperative enterprise".
 
In June 2011, the Mayor of the Oblast Council, Igor Dyatlov asked what support the idea of privatization on the condition of the before term presented airport development plan.

The air terminal complex before 2013 had a throughput capacity up to 400 passengers per hour on internal airline flights and up to 100 passengers per hour on international flights. Since late 2014, the throughput capacity is 300 persons per hour.

Then the airport felt into disarray so that by September 2014, buildings, facilities and customs and border checkpoint had to be prepared to resume operations after the Mykolaiv Oblast State Administration had decided one month earlier to re-open the airport.

In early 2018, Ukraine International Airlines intended to open flights to Mykolaiv in 2019 but still there are no flights yet from the carrier.

On 24 February 2022, Ukraine closed airspace to civilian flights due to Russian invasion of Ukraine.
Mykolaiv airport was completely destroyed during the Russian invasion in the spring of 2022.

Airlines and destinations

The following airlines operate regular scheduled and charter services at the airport.

As of 24 February 2022, all passenger flights have been suspended indefinitely.

Statistics

See also
 List of airports in Ukraine
 List of the busiest airports in Ukraine
 List of the busiest airports in Europe
 List of the busiest airports in the former USSR

References

External links 
 

Transport in Mykolaiv
Airports in Ukraine
Buildings and structures in Mykolaiv